The Gaucho (the official full title of the film is Douglas Fairbanks as The Gaucho) is a 1927 silent film starring Douglas Fairbanks and Lupe Vélez set in Argentina. The lavish adventure extravaganza, filmed at the height of Fairbanks' box office clout, was directed by F. Richard Jones with a running time of 115 minutes.

Fairbanks biographer Jeffrey Vance considers the film "a near masterwork" and "an anomaly among his [Fairbanks’] works." Vance also considers it a "daring departure, the film is an effort of unanticipated darkness in tone, setting, and character. The spirit of adolescent boyish adventure, the omnipresent characteristic of his prior films, is noticeably absent. It has been replaced by a spiritual fervor and an element of seething sexuality the likes of which has never been seen before in one of his productions.”

Cast
Douglas Fairbanks - The Gaucho
Lupe Vélez - The Mountain Girl
Joan Barclay (as Geraine Greear) - The Girl of the Shrine (younger)
Eve Southern - The Girl of the Shrine
Gustav von Seyffertitz - Ruiz, The Usurper
Charles Stevens - The Gaucho's First Lieutenant
Nigel De Brulier - The Padre
Albert MacQuarrie - Victim of the Black Doom
Mary Pickford - Virgin Mary (cameo)

Legacy

A new preservation print of The Gaucho, created by the Museum of Modern Art, was first shown at the Academy of Motion Picture Arts and Sciences in 2008. It has subsequently been screened at MoMA (2008), and the San Francisco Silent Film Festival (2009) to promote the new book Douglas Fairbanks with author Jeffrey Vance introducing the screenings.

The nickname for the sports teams of the University of California-Santa Barbara is The Gauchos in honor of Fairbanks' acting in the eponymous film.

References

External links

 
 

1927 films
1927 adventure films
American swashbuckler films
Fictional gauchos
Films about gauchos
American silent feature films
American black-and-white films
United Artists films
Films directed by F. Richard Jones
Films set in Argentina
American adventure films
1920s American films
Silent adventure films